Redfield is a small city in the Pine Bluff metropolitan area of northwestern Jefferson County in the U.S. state of Arkansas. As of the 2020 census, Redfield has a population of 1,505.

History

Following the arrival of the Little Rock, Mississippi River and Texas Railway (L. R., M. R. & T. Ry.), a settlement grew up around the new railroad depot (present-day Redfield Church of Christ) named for company president Jared E. Redfield of Essex, Connecticut. The municipality was incorporated by the Jefferson county court on October 18, 1898. Four properties have been added to the National Register of Historic Places (NRHP): Dollarway Road (1974), West James Street Overpass (1995), Lone Star Baptist Church (2005), and Redfield School Historic District (2014).

To the area now known as Redfield came Auguste Le noir de Serville, after serving with the French in the American Revolutionary War and being wounded at Yorktown. Killed by a falling tree in 1828, Serville was buried with honors, and his funeral was attended by political and military notables. The location of Serville's grave is unknown.

Geography
Redfield is located at  (34.445119, -92.182870).

Demographics

2020 census

As of the 2020 United States census, there were 1,505 people, 640 households, and 428 families residing in the city.

2010 census
As of the census of 2010, there were 1,297 people, 525 households and 369 families residing in the city. There were 581 housing units. The racial makeup of the city was 91.7% White, 4.8% Black or African American, 0.1% Native American, 0.5% Asian, 0% Pacific Islander, 0.6% from other races and 2.3% from two or more races. 1.8% of the population were Hispanic or Latino of any race. There were 525 households, out of which 29.9% had children under the age of 18 living with them, 52.2% were married couples living together, 13.3% had a female householder with no husband present, and 29.7% were non-families. 26.1% of all households were made up of individuals, and 22.9% had someone living alone who was 65 years of age or older. The average household size was 2.47 and the average family size was 2.95. The median age was 38.5 years.

Arts and culture
The Pine Bluff and Jefferson County Library System operates the public library, an about  library building, which opened in 1999.

Government
The Redfield City Council comprises the mayor of Redfield and six aldermen. The council determines the strategic direction and policies for the municipality and the Mayor in turn appoints staff to implement those policies and administer and manage the municipal services. Private citizens are welcome to attend the council meetings which are held in the Council Chamber of the City Hall at 212 North Brodie Street, Redfield, on the first Tuesday of the month at 7:00 p.m.

Education
Public education in northwest Jefferson county is administered by the White Hall School District. The school district manages two secondary schools (White Hall High School and White Hall Middle School) and four elementary schools. The M. A. Hardin Elementary School is located in Redfield.

Infrastructure
Redfield is on Highway 365 linking Pine Bluff and Little Rock, as well as Highway 46, linking it to Sheridan. It is also on Interstate 530 (via Highway 46).

See also
 CenturyTel of Redfield
 List of municipalities in Arkansas
 List of places named after people in the United States
 National Register of Historic Places listings in Jefferson County, Arkansas

References

Further reading

External links

 
 
 
 Redfield Chamber of Commerce
 Redfield Library at the Pine Bluff and Jefferson County Library System

 
1880 establishments in Arkansas
Cities in Jefferson County, Arkansas
Cities in Pine Bluff metropolitan area
Planned cities in the United States
Populated places established in 1880